Eldur is an Estonian and Icelandic male given name.

People named Eldur include:
 Eldur Parder (1928–2003), Estonian politician

References

Estonian masculine given names
Icelandic masculine given names